Alopoglossus carinicaudatus, the northern teiid, is a species of lizard in the family Alopoglossidae. It is found in Ecuador and Peru.

References

Alopoglossus
Reptiles described in 1876
Taxa named by Edward Drinker Cope